Trevor Potter (born October 24, 1955) is a lawyer, former commissioner and chairman of the United States Federal Election Commission. He is the Founder and President of the Campaign Legal Center, a nonprofit organization which works in the areas of campaign finance and elections, political communication and government ethics.  A Republican, he was the General Counsel to John McCain's two presidential campaigns. Potter is a vocal critic of unlimited corporate spending and dark money in politics allowed by the Citizens United v. FEC ruling.

He has been described by the American Bar Association Journal as "hands-down one of the top lawyers in the country on the delicate intersection of politics, law and money".

Early years and education 
Potter attended Brooks School in North Andover, MA. He earned his A.B. from Harvard University in 1978, and his Juris Doctor from University of Virginia School of Law in 1982.

Career

Potter's government experience also includes service as assistant general counsel of the United States Federal Communications Commission (1984–1985) and attorney with the United States Department of Justice (1982–1984). He served as General Counsel to the 2000 and 2008 Presidential campaigns of John McCain and Deputy General Counsel to the George H. W. Bush 1988 campaign.  Speaking in 2014, Potter said:

[Colbert] was able to show America the loopholes (or "loop-chasms" as he called them) in the laws designed to regulate coordination between candidates and supposedly "independent" groups. By having his own Super PAC and 501(c)(4), Stephen could evolve right alongside the campaigns—or often be a step ahead of them. His understanding of the possibilities inherent in the legal confusion was keen enough to discover and exploit absurd legalities before it became clear that actual candidates and political activists were doing the same thing.

The Colbert Reports segments on "Super PACs" were recognized in 2011 with a Peabody Award for parody reporting as an "innovative means of teaching American viewers about the landmark court decision". Reflecting on the experience in 2015, Potter said, "I was his lawyer for the venture, which meant I did everything from drafting a Federal Election Commission Advisory Opinion Request to accompanying Colbert to hearings. I even figured out how to make the money "disappear" from public view when the PAC was closing. (Hint: It's not that hard.) ... The final takeaway from my work with Colbert was a sense of the enormous and detrimental impact Citizens United has had on our campaigns and elections."

Potter was elected to the American Law Institute in 2013 and serves as an Adviser on ALI's Principles of Election Law: Resolution of Election Disputes project. He serves as the Senior Advisor to Issue One.

Works
Anthony Corrado (Editor), Thomas E. Mann (Editor), Daniel R. Ortiz (Editor), Trevor Potter (Editor), Frank J. Sorauf (Editor), Campaign Finance Reform: A Sourcebook, Brookings Institution Press (1997), 
Anthony Corrado (Editor), Thomas E. Mann (Editor), Trevor Potter (Editor), Inside the Campaign Finance Battle: Court Testimony on the New Reforms, Brookings Institution Press (2003), 
Anthony Corrado, Thomas E. Mann, Daniel R. Ortiz, Trevor Potter, The New Campaign Finance Sourcebook, Brookings Institution Press (2005), 
Trevor Potter, Political Activity, Lobbying Laws and Gift Rules Guide, Thomson West (2008), 
Joseph Birkenstock, Trevor Potter, Political Activity, Lobbying Laws and Gift Rules Guide, 2009-2010 ed., LegalWorks (2009), 
Joseph Birkenstock, Trevor Potter, Political Activity, Lobbying Laws and Gift Rules Guide, 2010-2011 ed., LegalWorks (2010), 
Joseph Birkenstock, Trevor Potter, Political Activity, Lobbying Laws and Gift Rules Guide, 3d, 2011-2012 ed., LegalWorks (2011),

See also
Federal Election Commission
Dark Money (film)

References

External links
Member profile at Caplin & Drysdale
Nonresident Senior Fellow at the Brookings Institution

Appearances on Moyers & Company
Appearances and news articles on The Colbert Report

American lawyers
Harvard College alumni
Living people
Members of the Federal Election Commission
University of Virginia School of Law alumni
1955 births
Brooks School alumni
George H. W. Bush administration personnel
Clinton administration personnel